The  is a 4-laned toll road in Kanagawa Prefecture, Japan. It is owned and managed by Central Nippon Expressway Company.

Route description
Officially the road is designated as National Route 271 as well as E85 under their "Expressway Numbering System."

The road connects western Kanagawa Prefecture (including the popular onsen resort town of Hakone) with Tokyo through the Tōmei Expressway. The route parallels Route 1 until Ōiso, where it then follows a northeasterly route through Hiratsuka and Isehara before terminating in Atsugi.

The road was opened in 1969 with 2 lanes. Expansion to 4 lanes was completed in 1978.

For toll collection purposes the road is divided into an Odawara section and an Atsugi section, with Ōiso Interchange as the dividing point. The toll for a normal passenger car to use one section is 350 yen.

List of interchanges and features

 IC - interchange, PA - parking area, TB - toll gate

References

External links
Central Nippon Expressway Company

Toll roads in Japan
271